Kudakkallu Parambu is a prehistoric Megalith burial site situated in Chermanangad of Thrissur District of Kerala. The site has 69 megalithic monuments spread over a small area. Different types of burials in this area include Topikkal, Kudakkal, multiple hood stones and stone circles. The Archaeological Survey of India says that these monuments were built around 2000 BCE. The Archaeological Survey of India has declared it as a centrally protected monument.

Gallery

See also

 Archaeology in India
 Timeline of Indian history
 List of Indus Valley Civilisation sites
 List of archaeological sites by country#India
 List of archaeological sites by continent and age
 World Heritage Sites by country#India

References

Prehistoric India
Megalithic monuments in India
Stone circles in India
Archaeological sites in Kerala
History of Kerala
History of Thrissur district
Tourist attractions in Thrissur district